Tacna (Aymara & Quechua: Taqna) is the southernmost department and region in Peru. The Chilean Army occupied the present-day Tacna Department during the War of the Pacific from 1885 until 1929 when it was reincorporated into Peru.

Geography
The department of Tacna has borders with the Pacific Ocean on the west, the department of Moquegua on the north, the department of Puno on the northeast, the Bolivian La Paz Department on the east, and the Arica-Parinacota Region of Chile on the south. The border between the Tacna Region and Chile is known as La Línea de la Concordia.

The region is located below the Titicaca plateau and has a diverse geography, including volcanoes, deserts, and mountainous zones, from which arise rivers that cross over the punas and the plateaus, thus forming the hydrographical system of this zone. The region is small in size but has a significant mining and agriculture potential. It has various climates and diverse production.

Climate
This area has a high level of sunshine year round due to its stable descending air and high pressure. According to the Köppen Climate Classification system, Tacna has a desert climate, abbreviated "Bwh" on climate maps.

History

Prehistoric era
There is evidence of the presence of a very early culture that goes back almost 10 000 years. The archaeological investigations in the region have proven that a civilization dwelt in this zone in the Stone Age. The Toquepala Caves (7630 BC) and Abrigo de Caru (6240 BC) belong to this age. There are other sites such as Girata Complex, Mullini, and Queñavichinca, where investigations have not been concluded.

Spanish conquest
The first groups of Spanish conquerors arrived in the region in 1535. These groups were formed by members of the Almagro expedition, organised to conquer Chile. During this time, the city of Tacna was called Villa San Pedro de Tacna. In 1615 and 1784 Tacna experienced violent earthquakes, and many towns were reduced to ruins. However, they were rebuilt in the same locations as before.

19th century
Tacna has a seat of honour in the emancipation process. In 1811, Francisco Antonio De Zela made the first declarations in favour of a libertarian administration from Tacna. Once the Peruvian independence struggle was well under way, the heroism of this city was honoured by  the revolutionary governmanet's proclamation to promote it to the rank of villa in 1823. On 26 May 1828, President José de La Mar promulgated a law passed by Congress by which the city of Tacna was given the title of Ciudad Heroica (Heroic City).

The administrative divisions before the war against Chile were as follows:

During the War of the Pacific against Chile, the tacneños made contributions to the resistance of the state to the advances of the Chilean forces into the province, some giving up their lives in defence of the nation.

Chilean administration

On 26 May 1880, after the Battle of Alto de la Alianza, the Chilean army occupied the Tacna province. Under the terms of the treaty, Chile was to occupy the provinces of Tacna and Arica for ten years, after which a plebiscite was to be held to determine the region's sovereignty. Tacna remained under Chilean control for 50 years, during which Chilean groups and authorities lead a campaign of Chilenization in an attempt to persuade the local population to abandon their Peruvian past and accept Chilean nationality.

However, Peruvian nationalists ensured that the Chilean propaganda failed and the planned plebiscite was never held. Finally, in 1929, the Treaty of Lima was signed in which Chile kept Arica, while Peru regained Tacna whilst receiving a $6 million indemnity and other concessions. From 1890 to 1929, Locumba served as the provisional capital of the area of the department not under Chilean administration.

Some of the important persons who lived in Tacna during the Chilean administration was Salvador Allende and his family; they lived in the city for eight years. Allende lived in Tacna sincefrom when he was a baby. He arrived in 1908 and studied in the Tacna School (Liceo de Tacna).

Maritime dispute

On 26 January 2007, Peru's government issued a protest against Chile’s demarcation of the coastal frontier that the two countries share. Peruvian President Alan García recalled his ambassador to Chile, Hugo Otero, to Lima to consult about the controversy over the maritime boundary the two countries share. According to the Peruvian Foreign Ministry, the Chilean legislatures endorsed a plan regarding the Arica and Parinacota region which did not comply with the established demarcation of the border. They alleged that the proposed Chilean law included an assertion of sovereignty over 19,000 square metres of land in Peru's Department of Tacna.

According to the Peruvian Foreign Ministry, Chile had defined a new region "without respecting the Concordia demarcation." The Peruvian government maintained that the dispute over the Chilean plan is part of an ongoing maritime dispute whereby Chile had tried to use the demarcation process to extend its maritime frontier. Over the past 50 years, Peru has maintained claims over roughly 40,000 square kilometers of ocean territory. The Chilean government asserted that the region in dispute is not a coastal site named Concordia, but instead refers to boundary stone No. 1, which is located to the northeast and 200 meters inland.

Given that the proposed Chilean law did not recognize the borderline established by both nations in the 1929 agreement, Peru lodged diplomatic protests with Chile. In the complex territorial dispute, Chile was asserting the border near the Pacific Ocean to fit in the geographical parallel, which Lima asserted would cut off at least 19,000 squares metres of the Peruvian territory.

A possible border dispute was averted when the Chilean Constitutional Court ruled on the issue on 26 January 2007, striking down the legislation. Whilst agreeing with the court's ruling, the Chilean government reiterated its stance that the maritime borders between the two nations were not in question and had been formally approved by the international community.

On 28 January 2007, Peru's leading newspaper El Comercio reported that the President of the Cabinet of Ministers  (Consejo de Ministros del Perú), Jorge del Castillo, expressed his grave concern over the pending maritime dispute with Chile.

On 27 January 2014, in the final ruling of the International Court of Justice located in The Hague, Peru gained some maritime territory. From that point, the new border runs in a southwesterly direction to a point that is  equidistant from the coast of the two countries. Under the ruling, Chile lost control over part of its formerly claimed maritime territory and gave additional maritime territory to Peru.

From the 27 January 2014 court press release:

Political division

Tacna Department is divided into four provinces (singular: provincia), which are composed of 26 districts (distritos, singular: distrito).

Provinces
The provinces, with their capitals in parenthesis, are:
Candarave (Candarave)
Jorge Basadre (Locumba)
Tacna (Tacna)
Tarata (Tarata)

Economy

Tacna's primary income earner is copper mining. Agriculturally, Tacna produces 53.15% of the whole olive crop in Peru. It also produces maize, potatoes, wheat, cotton, oregano, alfalfa, and grapevine (for the production of wine and pisco). It also has a sizable herd of dairy cattle and lamb.

In addition to mining and agriculture, fishing is also important, as Tacna's offshore region is abundant in fish resources.

Local customs

Typical dishes and beverages
Tacna offers visitors colorful dishes exquisitely combined and abundantly served. The picante a la Tacneña and patazca Tacneña belong to this region. Corn and cheese, chicharrones with toasted corn, cuy, or guinea pig chactado, corn cake with peanuts and raisins, baked pork, grilled lamb, are also local specialties. To drink, Tacna has macerated Brussels apricot, frutilla or tumbo, and wines produced in the local vineyards.

Festivities
Carnivals. They are celebrated in different towns and villages with typical local dances that can go on for entire days and nights.

 April – the Corn and Potato Festival in Tacna.
 26 May – the Anniversary of the Battle of Alto de la Alianza.
 7 June – the Anniversary of the Battle of Arica.
 20 June – Day to remember the tacneño patriot Francisco Antonio De Zela.
 23 June - Night of San Juan.
 28 August - Procesión de la Bandera. A civic procession act in which women of Tacna carry the red and white Peruvian flag through the streets of the city. Later, various associations, groups of students, and the armed and police forces take part in a parade that ends in the main square, where the Arch of the Heroes is located. It is part of a week that celebrates the reincorporation of Tacna into Peruvian territory. Simultaneously, a fair for farm and livestock products, industrial goods, and handicrafts takes place.

References

External links
 Gobierno Regional de Tacna – Tacna Regional Government official website
 Diario Digital Sur Noticias  – Tacna Digital News official website
 www.tacnavirtual.com web site of Tacna

 
Regions of Peru